The Type 052C destroyer (NATO/OSD Luyang II-class destroyer) is a class of guided-missile destroyers in the Chinese People's Liberation Army Navy Surface Force (PLAN). The Type 052C introduced both fixed active electronically scanned array (AESA) radar and vertically launched surface-to-air missiles into PLAN service, making it the first Chinese warship with area air defence capability.

, six of these destroyers had been built and were operational.

Program 
No new ships were laid down until 2010; the pause may have been due to the relocation of the shipyard.

Design

The Type 052C appears to share the same basic hull design as the Type 052B destroyer, which in turn is based on the Type 051B destroyer. Stealth features are incorporated.

The Type 052C uses predominantly Chinese systems derived from earlier foreign technology; the preceding Type 052 and Type 052B destroyers used a mixture of Russian and Chinese systems.

Missiles 

The SAMs are cold launched from eight revolver-type vertical launchers, with six missiles per launcher.

Eight YJ-62 anti-ship missiles are carried in two quad-canister launchers just forward of the hangar.

Guns 
The main gun is a  PJ-87. The gun suffered from jamming and may have influenced the decision to adopt a different weapon for the Type 052D destroyer. The weapon has a rate of fire of 25 rounds per minute.

Close-in defence is provided by two seven-barrel  Type 730 CIWS, one mounted forward of the bridge and one atop the hangar. Each gun has a maximum rate of fire of 4200 rounds per minute.

Anti-submarine systems 
Two triple  torpedo tubes are carried; these are copies or derivatives of the Whitehead Alenia Sistemi Subacquei B515/ILAS-3. This launcher may fire the Yu-7 ASW torpedo.

Radar 

The Type 052C is the first PLAN warship to mount the G-band Type 346 AESA radar. The four phased array antennas are mounted on the taller forward superstructure. The Type 346 is used for air search, and provides fire control for the HHQ-9. The combination of AESA radar and VLS SAMs produces a marked increase in anti-aircraft firepower over previous Chinese warships.

Aircraft 
A Kamov Ka-28 or Harbin Z-9 helicopter may operate from the rear hangar and flight deck. The Ka-28 is equipped with a search radar and dipping sonar and can also employ sonobuoys, torpedoes, depth charges, or mines. The Z-9 is a variant of the Airbus Helicopters AS365 Dauphin. The naval variant of the Z-9, the Z-9C, is equipped with the KLC-1 search radar, dipping sonar, and is typically armed with a single, lightweight torpedo. Either helicopter significantly improves the anti-submarine capabilities of the Type 052C.

Propulsion
The Type 052C propulsion is in the combined diesel or gas (CODOG) arrangement, with two Ukrainian DA80 gas turbines and two MTU 20V 956TB92 diesel engines.

The DA80s had blade problems and may have contributed to the last two Type 052Cs sitting pierside at the shipyard for two years without being accepted by the PLAN.

The MTU 20V 956TB92 engines were license-produced by Shaanxi Diesel Engine Works.

Ships of class

Gallery

See also
List of naval ship classes in service
Guided-missile destroyer

References

Bibliography

External links 

 Type 052C on Naval-Technology
 Chinese Defense Today (Sinodefense) page on 052C Destroyer
 Chinese Defense Today (Sinodefense) page on the YJ-62 (C-602) Anti-Ship Missile

Destroyer classes